State Route 174 (SR 174) is a primary state highway in the U.S. state of Virginia. The state highway runs  from U.S. Route 220 Business (US 220 Business) in Collinsville east to SR 457 in Martinsville. SR 174 is a C-shaped route between the de facto county seat of Henry County, Collinsville, and the nominal county seat and independent city of Martinsville.

Route description

SR 174 begins at an intersection with US 220 Business (Virginia Avenue) in Collinsville. The state highway heads northeast as Kings Mountain Road, a four-lane undivided highway. SR 174 becomes a divided highway as it curves east and passes by the Henry County offices and courthouse. The state highway curves south and intersects SR 108 (Figsboro Road) and SR 714 (College Drive), which serves Patrick & Henry Community College and several industrial parks. South of Beaver Creek Plantation, SR 174 becomes a three-lane road with a center left-turn lane and enters the city of Martinsville as Liberty Street. The state highway passes under the Dick & Willie Passage Rail Trail before reaching its eastern terminus at SR 457 (Commonwealth Boulevard) north of downtown Martinsville.

Major intersections

References

External links

Virginia Highways Project: VA 174

174
State Route 174
State Route 174